Shem-Tov Sabag (שם טוב סבג; nicknamed "Shemi"; born April 13, 1959) is an Israeli former Olympic marathoner. He won both the 1984 Lake County Marathon and the 1989 Vancouver Marathon.

Early life
Sabag was born in Israel, his hometown is Haifa and he later lived in Tiberias, and he is Jewish. He started running marathons at age 17, at the urging of a high school coach, but lost three years of training as he served with a tank unit in the Israel Defense Forces.

Education
He studied as a pre-med student at Augustana College in Rock Island, Illinois. There, he was an All-American in cross-country. In November 1983, he came in 8th in the NCAA Men's Division III Cross Country Championship, and in May 1984 he came in 2nd in the 10,000 meters and 6th in the 5,000 meters.

Running career
His personal best time in the marathon was 2-18:23, which he ran in June 1984 in Duluth, Minnesota.  His personal best in the half-marathon was 1-06:13, which he ran in Philadelphia, Pennsylvania, in September 1986.

In April 1984 he won his first marathon in his eighth race at that distance, in Chicago, Illinois, in the Lake County Marathon in 2-21:47.

He competed for Israel at the 1984 Summer Olympics in Los Angeles, California, at the age of 25. Running in the Men's Marathon he came in 60th out of 107 competitors, with a time of 2-31:34.

Sabag won the Vancouver Marathon in May 1989 with a time of 2-19:41.

References 

Living people
People from Tiberias
Israeli male long-distance runners
Olympic athletes of Israel
Athletes (track and field) at the 1984 Summer Olympics
1959 births
Sportspeople from Haifa
Israeli male marathon runners
Augustana College (Illinois) alumni
Israeli male cross country runners